Dive brakes or dive flaps are deployed to slow down an aircraft when in a dive. They often consist of a metal flap that is lowered against the air flow, thus creating drag and reducing dive speed.

In the past, dive brakes were mostly used on dive bombers, which needed to dive very steeply, but without exceeding their red line speed, in order to drop their bombs accurately. The airbrakes or spoilers fitted to gliders often function both as landing aids, to adjust the approach angle, and to keep the aircraft's speed below its maximum permissible indicated air speed in a vertical dive. Most modern combat aircraft are equipped with air brakes, which perform the same function as dive brakes.

Applications
 Aichi D3A
 Dornier Do 217 (attachable dorsal/ventral "petal" design at extreme rear of fuselage)
 Douglas SBD Dauntless
 Junkers Ju 87
 Nelson Hummingbird PG-185B
 Northrop BT
 Schweizer SGS 2-33
 A-36 Invader
 SB2U Vindicator
 Blackburn Firebrand

References

Aircraft controls